Ancient and modern are terms used in heraldry to differentiate two different coats of arms used at different periods by a family or other bearer. Reasons for changing arms have been numerous, the most famous being the 1376 change in the French royal arms by Charles V of France to show three fleurs-de-lis instead of semee de lis, possibly to symbolize the Holy Trinity. The reasons for other changes were more prosaic, for example where a court of chivalry ordered a change or differencing where two families claimed the same arms, as in the famous case of Scrope v Grosvenor. The resulting two versions of arms are referred to as "France ancient" and "France modern",  "Grosvenor ancient" and "Grosvenor modern".

List of examples

See also
 List of oldest heraldry

References

Heraldry